Screaming is a British television sitcom which originally aired on BBC 1 in 1992. Three women, former school friends, sharing a home have all unwittingly had a relationship with the same man.

Main cast
 Gwen Taylor as Annie
 Penelope Wilton as Beatrice
 Jill Baker as Rachael
 Anthony Barclay as Florian

References

Bibliography
 Horace Newcomb. Encyclopedia of Television. Routledge, 2014.

External links
 

1992 British television series debuts
1992 British television series endings
1990s British comedy television series
BBC television sitcoms
English-language television shows